A Man's Not a Camel is Frenzal Rhomb's fourth studio album, released in March 1999. The singles "You are Not My Friend", "Never Had So Much Fun" and "We're Going Out Tonight" all received considerable play-time on radio and television music video programmes, boosting the band's reputation. In July 2011, the album was voted 92nd in Triple J's Hottest 100 Australian Albums of All Time.

Track listing (original Australian version)

Track listing (USA Fat Wreck Chords version)

Charts

Certifications

External links
 Talking Records podcast episode #76: Frenzal Rhomb - A Man's Not a Camel - guitarist Lindsay McDougall is interviewed about the circumstances surrounding the album's recording and release

References

1999 albums
Frenzal Rhomb albums
Fat Wreck Chords albums
Albums produced by Eddie Ashworth